Rufohammus is a genus of longhorn beetles of the subfamily Lamiinae, containing the following species:

 Rufohammus rufescens Breuning, 1939
 Rufohammus rufifrons (Aurivillius, 1927)

References

Lamiini